Sosnovsky Urban Settlement or Sosnovskoye Urban Settlement is the name of several municipal formations in Russia.
Sosnovsky Urban Settlement, a municipal formation which Sosnovsky Settlement Council in Sosnovsky District of Tambov Oblast is incorporated as
Sosnovskoye Urban Settlement, a municipal formation which the Town of Sosnovka in Vyatskopolyansky District of Kirov Oblast is incorporated as
Sosnovskoye Urban Settlement, a municipal formation which the Work Settlement of Sosnovskoye in Sosnovsky District of Nizhny Novgorod Oblast is incorporated as

See also
Sosnovsky (disambiguation)

References

Notes

Sources

